Acropora indonesia is a species of acroporid coral that was first described by Dr Carden Wallace in 1997. It is listed as a vulnerable species on the IUCN Red List, and it is thought to have a decreasing population. It is common and found over a large area, and is listed on CITES Appendix II.

Description
In colour, it is between dark grey/dark brown and pale, and the branches are tightly packed, thin, and upright. Branches at the perimeter of the structure have upward-facing ends and are up to 80mm long, and the axial corallites are normally obvious. The radial corallites are the same size. Within genus Acropora, there are no species similar to this. The species is composed of aragonite (calcium carbonate).

Distribution
Acropora indonesia is common and found over a large area; the Indo-Pacific, Banggai, Raja Ampat, Thailand, Sulawesi, Indonesia (all six regions), the Solomon Islands, and the Philippines. It is native to Thailand, Singapore, Australia, Indonesia, Malaysia, Papua New Guinea, Myanmar, and the Philippines. There is no exact population for the species, but it is known to be decreasing overall, given threats from disease and bleaching caused by the rising sea temperatures. It is prey to starfish Acanthaster planci, which is becoming a common species, and is threatening numbers of Acropora species. It is also threatened by human activities, fishing, climate change, and industry. It is classed as a vulnerable species on the IUCN Red List, is listed under CITES Appendix II, and may occur in Marine Protected Areas.

Taxonomy
C. C. Wallace first described the species in 1997 as Acropora indonesia, in Indonesia.

References

Acropora
Cnidarians of the Pacific Ocean
Fauna of the Indian Ocean
Marine fauna of Asia
Marine fauna of Oceania
Fauna of Indonesia
Fauna of Southeast Asia
Vulnerable fauna of Asia
Vulnerable fauna of Oceania
Animals described in 1997